The Port of Málaga is an international seaport located in the city of Málaga in southern Spain, on the Costa del Sol coast of the Mediterranean. It is the oldest continuously-operated port in Spain and one of the oldest in the Mediterranean.

Principal port activities include cruise shipping and the importation of containerised manufactured products, break bulk and vehicles. A small fishing fleet also operates from the port.

History

Ancient and medieval times 
The Port of Malaga was founded by Phoenicians from Tyre in around 1000 BC. The name Malaka is probably derived from the Phoenician word for salt because fish was salted on the first dock; in other Semitic languages the word for salt is still Hebrew מלח mélaḥ or Arabic ملح milḥ. This first dock was a single waterfront quay parallel to the shore and extending for about 500 metres from the customs house to the Puerta Oscura.

By Roman times Malaga had become an important export port for minerals, pottery, almonds, wine and oil. An Iberian delicacy was fish prepared with garum, large quantities of which were also exported to Rome.

Trade continued to grow, peaking when Malaga (now Mālaqah (Arabic مالقة) was declared the capital of the Islamic kingdom of Granada. When the kingdom passed into Catholic control in 1487 the port assumed a strategic importance as an embarkation point for Spanish soldiers in the conquest of the Rif, Melilla, Peñon de Velez and Oran, and was renamed the Port of Málaga.

Imperial Spain 
The Port of Málaga grew swiftly throughout the 16th and 17th centuries, establishing itself as Spain's major export port for cereals and manufactures during the Habsburg and Enlightenment eras. In 1720 King Philip V appointed French engineer Bartolome Thurus to prepare a project of port expansion for commercial and military needs, culminating in the construction of both the East Dock and the New Quay. The first lighthouse was built in 1814.

Twentieth century 
Between 1900 and 1910 an extensive reconstruction of port facilities resulted in the modernization of the existing quays and the completion of the current passenger terminal. The Málaga-Puertollano oil pipeline was completed by 1920, permitting oil exports directly from the port.

After the Second World War the importance of the port declined as new ports opened in North Africa and the Middle East, and post-war reconstruction led to the massive expansion of facilities at Port of Rotterdam and elsewhere. The Puertotollano pipeline ceased operation in the 1990s. Port operations were concentrated around ten wharves on the southern  border of the existing port. The northern and central port areas were then progressively returned to the control of the city and converted for residential use.

Port facilities 
Ten wharves are currently in operation at the Port of Málaga:

 East Quay: Embarkation for cruise ship.
 Quay n°1 "Ricardo Gross": Megayatchs and touristic cruise ships.
 Quay n°2 "Guadiaro": Cruise ships.
 Quay n°3 "Canovas": Roll-on/roll-off.
 Quay n°4 "Heredia": Roll-on/roll-off, bulk liquids, break bulk.
 Quay n°5 Floating dock: Repairs and defence forces.
 Quay n°6 "Romero Oak grove 1": Bulk liquids, dangerous goods.
 Quay n°7 "Romero Oak grove 2": Bulk liquids, dangerous goods.
 Multipurpose Quay n°9: Containers, Roll-on/roll-off
 Soft Port 1: bulk liquid import/export where specialist equipment required.

The quays are connected by a system of internal roads and a network of internal and external railway lines . Access to the Port is via State Highways A-7 (Barcelona-Cádiz) that runs by the coast, and A-45 (Córdoba-Málaga). The internal rail network links the Harbor Services Area with the Málaga Main Station.

The port is dominated by imports, principally an annual throughput of nearly 2 million tonnes of break bulk within a total annual throughput of 3.1 million tonnes. Major imports include cement, clinker coal, cereals, grains, petroleum coke and fertilizers. A substantially smaller export trade is centred on processed food and construction equipment.

The port handles in excess of 450,000 TEU's annually, and 39,000 vehicles. Liquid bulk handling is approximately 70,000 metric tonnes per year, principally olive oil import and export.

Cruise shipping is also an essential industry at the port, with 211,000 passenger embarkations each year from more than 220 cruise ships.

The existing Mario López Shipyard and Shiprepair facilities are part of the Cernaval Group Shipyards, founded by the local naval entrepreneur Mr. Mario López on the early eighties; this installation has been a mayor player in the local marine sector for many years, and with over 40 shiprepairs yearly with vessels from all over the world a very important asset for the Port of Málaga, in future more investments are fixed to continue the development of this industry.

Future works 

An extensive program of works are planned for the Port as part of a Special plan developed by the City of Málaga.

The Hereida Quay will be refurbished to expand port operation centres and provide an additional 500 car spaces. The works are estimated at 33 million euros. A new passenger terminal, port museum and  environmental education centre are planned for inclusion in the cruise ship facilities at Quay 2 at a further cost of 22 million euros.

A commercial marina will also operate from Quay 1, catering for 24 superyachts of up to 30 metres, and the Eastern Quay passenger terminal will be remodeled to improve pedestrian access and double existing capacity to 560,000 passengers a year.

The total area of the new terminal is 1,270 m2, consisting of two heights and two new berths: Southern Berth and Northern Berth with a total construction cost of 21.3 million euros.

References

External links

 
Puertos del Estado 

Malaga
Buildings and structures in Málaga